Noah's Ark Zoo Farm is a  zoo developed on a working farm in Wraxall, North Somerset,  west of Bristol, England. In 2009 the zoo was expelled from the British and Irish Association of Zoos and Aquariums, the main industry regulatory body, "for bringing the association into disrepute", but in 2018 it regained membership in the body. The zoo has the largest elephant enclosure in northern Europe.

History

Anthony Bush
Noah’s Ark Zoo Farm was conceived by Anthony Bush (b. 1938), the son of a Wiltshire farm manager.  Bush attended Monkton Combe School, served a stint as an officer in National Service with the Somerset Light Infantry, and attended Worcester College, Oxford, for a year before deciding to return to farming.  In 1960 he became a tenant of Richard Gibbs, Lord Wraxall, at Moat House Farm, near Bristol, which Bush operated as a dairy farm.  In 1962 he married Christina James, an art teacher, and they had four children. In 1968 Bush was elected onto the Somerset County Executive Committee of the National Farmers Union, and in 1980, he began a Farming and Wildlife Advisory Group to encourage farmers to conserve wildlife.

At Monkton Combe, Bush attended Christian Union meetings and "asked God who I knew was out there, to forgive me and to come into my life, to be involved with everyday stuff, change me and use me".  Bush and wife became active at St. Philip and St. Jacob Church, helping to revive the church with a youth program.  In 1967 Bush became a member of the Anglican Church Assembly, and in 1974 he and his wife established the Bristol Family Life Association, which lobbied on behalf of marriage education and against the use of obscenities on television.  Later, the Bushes established Marriage Repair, a counselling service.  In 1982, Bush became director of Mission England, which organised a Billy Graham evangelistic campaign in 1985 at Ashton Gate Stadium.  In 1987, Bush helped found the African relief agency, Send a Cow.

Development
In 1995 the Bushes purchased Moat House Farm from Wraxall, sold the Friesian herd, and converted the farm's  to arable land and sheep raising. Bush began to consider creating a Noah's Ark theme park in 1997; and in 1998, he constructed a barn, a café, a toilet block, and a children's play area. The park opened for a trial run in August 1998 and permanently in 1999. At first it exhibited farm and small domestic animals as well as some exotic species such as alpacas and llamas. The collection later expanded to include tigers, African lions, white rhinos, siamang gibbons, and ring-tailed lemurs. In April 2009, a zoo webcam showed the live birth of a male Brazilian tapir.

Before construction of the sanctuary the Born Free Foundation, which opposes holding elephants in captivity, said the acreage was too small for the purpose. The enclosure consists of a  area where the elephants can sleep or shelter from the rain, and a  outdoor area with a  heated swimming pool. The £1.8m development was partly funded by the European Agricultural Fund for Rural Development and uses solar PV, biomass heating, and rainwater harvesting to provide nearly all power needed to operate the enclosure. An adjacent farm provides most of the food for the elephants.

In 2015, Noah’s Ark joined the European Endangered Species Programme (EEP), which oversees management and conservation of protected species. The zoo is home to two spectacled bears (also called Andean bears), who arrived in 2016.

Creationism
Bush, and formerly the zoo, promote belief in a form of creationism as well as the Genesis flood myth and explicate these beliefs at length at "earthhistory.org.uk". Bush does not accept flood geology, a Young Earth Creationist belief that the flood described in Genesis 6–8 was an actual event that produced most fossil bearing geological strata; rather he believes the earth to be about 100,000 years old, older than the 6,000 to 10,000 years that Young Earth creationists believe it to be but much younger than its actual age of 4.54 billion years.

Physical anthropologist Alice Roberts, professor of Public Engagement in Science at the University of Birmingham said the zoo had "absolutely nothing to do with science education" but noted of her visit that she saw little evidence of creationism until she entered a "large barn in the middle of the complex, which houses an auditorium and an impressive indoor children's play area," where she found many displays promoting creationism.

The zoo has been criticised by the British Centre for Science Education for "contradicting vast swaths of science needed to pass public examinations" (contrary to its claim that it supported the National Curriculum)  and by Ben Goldacre, author of the Bad Science column of The Guardian. In August 2009, the British Humanist Association (after 2017 Humanists UK) urged tourist boards to stop promoting the zoo on grounds that it would "undermine education and the teaching of science", a campaign continued as recently as February 2014. (In June 2015, the BHA named Alice Roberts "Humanist of the Year", in part because she had spearheaded its complaint against Noah's Ark Zoo.) In a letter to the Anglican Church Times, the Rev. Michael Roberts, an authority on Darwin and geology and a long-time opponent of the teaching of creationism in schools, argued that the British Humanist Association was justified in criticising the zoo and that "church groups should have been more forthright in their criticism".

2009 charges of professional misconduct
In October 2009 the BBC and the Captive Animals Protection Society charged that the zoo's tigers and camels belonged to the now defunct Great British Circus owned by Martin Lacey; and the zoo said a number of animals were on loan from Linctrek Ltd, a company associated with Lacey, though none had taken part in any circus performances.  In December 2009, BIAZA stripped the zoo of its membership for what it claimed was a refusal of Noah's Ark to provide BIAZA requested information and for bringing "the association into disrepute." In 2018, the zoo regained membership in BIAZA.

Also in 2009, the Western Animal Rights Network (WARN) and the Captive Animals Protection Society (CAPS) said that the zoo had culled healthy chickens. CAPS claimed that the zoo regularly culled animals during winter months to reduce costs. The zoo explained that it had euthanised some chickens to protect the quality of its flock. A March 2010 report of an investigation by North Somerset Council called the CAPS allegations "grossly unfair", though because zoo inspectors found some failures to comply with the Secretary of State's Standards of Modern Zoo Practice, tighter licence conditions were imposed on the zoo, including inspection by independent veterinarians every six months.

Animal exhibits
 Africa The first animals arrived in the African section in 2005: two South African white rhinos.  A Giraffe House opened in 2006, two African lions joined the Big Cat Sanctuary in 2010, and Elephant Eden introduced its first African elephant in 2014. In 2015, Noah's Ark included four giraffes (two of which were born at NAZF), four lions, two African elephants, two white rhinos, two zebras, and a family of meerkats. In 2020, Hope, an 8-month old zebra, died when she was startled by fireworks and collided with the gates of her enclosure. in June 2021, an African elephant was fatally attacked by another elephant.
 Asia In 2009, Noah's Ark introduced two Bengal tigers to the newly built 'Tiger Territory', which later became the 'Big Cat Sanctuary'. Noah's Ark Asian section is also home to yaks, water buffalo, and two Bactrian camels.
 Primates Noah's Ark is home to five primate species: Siamang Gibbons, black & white ruffed lemurs, ring tailed lemurs, marmosets and cotton-top tamarins. Three of the five primates (ruffed lemurs, tamarins and gibbons) are listed on the IUCN red list as either endangered or critically endangered. The primate section has successfully bred animals since its opening, most recently a baby Siamang gibbon. (The gibbons were moved to Noah's Ark as part of the European Endangered Species Programme in 2007.)
 Reptiles In July 2017 the zoo introduced seven Aldabra giant tortoises to the zoo on loan from Nigel Marven. The tortoise enclosure won an award from BIAZA for enclosure design.

Maze

References

External links
 

Tourist attractions in Somerset
Zoos in England
Creationist organizations
Denialism
Mazes in the United Kingdom
Noah's Ark